Anthony Marshall (born 14 May 1964) is a British actor, known for his roles as Nelson in Life on Mars and Noel Garcia in Casualty. He has made appearances in numerous television series, including Coronation Street, The Bill, All Quiet on the Preston Front, The Queen's Nose, Only Fools and Horses and Doctors.

Career
Marshall made his professional acting debut in four episodes of the ITV soap opera Coronation Street, as Roy Valentine. From 2006 to 2007, he portrayed the role of Nelson in the BBC drama series Life on Mars and the final episode of its spinoff, Ashes to Ashes.

From 2008 to 2021, he appeared in the BBC medical drama Casualty as receptionist Noel Garcia. In an episode broadcast on 2 January 2021, Marshall's character died of COVID-19. Marshall's departure was kept secret to avoid disappointment, he had played the role for 12 years. Before appearing as Noel, he made two separate guest stars. The first was in the series eight episode "Cat In Hell" as Roy, a train conductor, and the second was in the series eighteen episode "Second Best", where he played an unnamed parking attendant. On 14 March 2017, Marshall appeared as Noel on the sister series, Holby City. He appeared in Holby City again in on 5 March 2019. In 2018, Marshall appeared in an episode of Still Open All Hours, as Mr. Selby.

References

External links
 

English male television actors
Living people
Black British male actors
1964 births
Male actors from Manchester
20th-century English male actors
21st-century English male actors
British people of Surinamese descent